John "Jack" Robson Gregg (1909–1964) was an English businessman, best known as the founder of Greggs, the United Kingdom's largest bakery chain.

Biography
Gregg was born at Canada Street, Newcastle upon Tyne, in 1909. At the age of 14 he joined the family egg and yeast business. He would make deliveries on his pushbike to local working-class homes. He acquired a van in the 1930s.

Gregg was called up to serve in the British Army during World War II and during this time his wife bought a second van and started distributing confectionery as well as ingredients for bread. In 1939 he founded Greggs, a family bakery store in Tyneside, with its first shop opening in 1951 on Gosforth high street. By 1953 the business consisted of one shop and six vans selling products from the bakery.

He died of lung cancer in 1964. After his death, his son, Ian Gregg, took over the family business.

Personal life
He was married to Elsie and together they went on to have two sons, Colin and Ian, and one daughter, Gay. He was also known by the name "Jack".

He was a Freemason.

References

1964 deaths
British retail company founders
Freemasons of the United Grand Lodge of England
Businesspeople from Newcastle upon Tyne
1909 births
English Anglicans
Deaths from lung cancer
British Army personnel of World War II
20th-century English businesspeople